The Socialist Party of Ontario (SPO) was a socialist political party in the Canadian province of Ontario from 2011 until 2016. The SPO was founded in 2011 by political activists, trade unionists, community leaders, feminists and socialists, many of whom were former members of the Ontario New Democratic Party (NDP) who sought to challenge the NDP's perceived shift to the centre of the political spectrum. Modeled after Québec solidaire and the United Left Alliance in Ireland, the party adopted the name of the historic Socialist Party of Canada, though maintained no connections to the former entity.  The party fielded five candidates in the October 2011 Ontario general election and two candidates in the 2014 Ontario general election. Following the 2014 vote, the party became inactive and, in 2016, was de-registered by Elections Ontario.

History
On 28 May 2011, the Socialist Party of Ontario was formed at a founding convention in Toronto. Its constitution and preliminary policy platform were voted on and passed, maintaining a socialist preamble in its constitution that was inspired by the Regina Manifesto of the defunct Co-operative Commonwealth Federation. The Party had a collective leadership, with no single member functioning as the traditional "party leader". In place of a leader, the party operated with two spokespeople, one male and one female, and, at its founding, elected Jan Maxwell and Michael Laxer to these positions. Laxer was named chair of the party executive to fulfill Elections Ontario's requirements to designate a "Leader" and a "President". The party registered with Elections Ontario on September 13, 2011.

The SPO nominated five candidates in the 2011 provincial election Its first candidate, Dr. Ken Ranney, was nominated by the party to run in Peterborough on 31 August 2011. Subsequently, the party nominated candidates in Etobicoke–Lakeshore, Leeds–Grenville, St. Paul's, and Trinity–Spadina.

For the 2014 election, the SPO nominated two candidates, Andrea Quiano in Peterborough and Natalie Lochwin in Etobicoke—Lakeshore. For the election, the party nominated Lochwin to serve as spokesperson. The party's share of the popular vote decreased and, overall, the SPO placed 19th out of the 21 parties and independents running in the election.

Immediately following the 2014 provincial election, the party fell into a state of disarray and no longer updated its website. By late 2016, the SPO was de-registered by Elections Ontario. The party's name was re-reserved with Elections Ontario in May 2016, but the reservation was voided following a year of inactivity by the party's activists. No effort was to resurrect the party for the 2018 provincial election.

Election results

References

External links
Socialist Party of Ontario website, last updated in 2014.

Socialist parties in Canada
Political parties established in 2011
2011 establishments in Ontario
Defunct provincial political parties in Ontario
Defunct political parties in Canada